SS New England was a Design 1023 cargo ship built for the United States Shipping Board immediately after World War I.

History
She was laid down as yard number 112 at the Newark, New Jersey shipyard of the Submarine Boat Corporation (SBC), one of 132 Design 1023 cargo ships built for the United States Shipping Board (there were 154 ships of the class built in total). She was launched on 31 January 1920, completed in April 1920, and named the New England. In 1929, she was broken up at the Baltimore, Maryland shipyard of Union Shipbuilding.

References

Bibliography

External links
 EFC Design 1023: Illustrations

1920 ships
Merchant ships of the United States
Ships built by the Submarine Boat Company
Design 1023 ships